The Independent Association of Georgian Journalists (IAGJ) was founded by the group of professional journalists in Georgia in 2000. It was created in order to solve the issues concerning journalists' professional activities, also to protect pluralistic democracy and internationally recognized human rights. The Association is independent from all kinds of ideological, governmental, political and religious bodies.

IAGJ represents more than 150 journalists in Georgia. It is the first independent journalists association in Georgia that became a member of International Federation of Journalists.

There is another journalists union (formed in Soviet period) in Georgia still controlled by the government.

The association relates and cooperates with all non-governmental and governmental organizations that can take part in the development at independent media.

IAGJ is a member of: Central Asia Southern Caucasus Freedom Exspression Network (CASCFEN), see on the web: , and Caucasian Refugees and IDP's NGO network (CRINGO), see on the web: 

In March 2001 the Independent Association of Georgian Journalists prepared and adopted Code of Journalistic Ethics. In this document all internationally recognized principles of journalistic profession are taken into consideration.

External links
 Home page
 IAGJ Code of Ethics

Georgian journalism organisations
Journalism-related professional associations
International Federation of Journalists
Journalists from Georgia (country)